So Long Been Dreaming: Postcolonial Science Fiction & Fantasy (2004) is an anthology of short stories by African, Asian, South Asian, and Indigenous authors, as well as North American and British writers of colour, edited by the writer Nalo Hopkinson and Uppinder Mehan. Hopkinson provides the introduction, although it is usually misattributed to Samuel R. Delany (whose recommendation of the book is quoted on the book's cover).

Stories
 Nisi Shawl, "Deep End"
 Andrea Hairston, "Griots of the Galaxy"
 Suzette Mayr, "Toot Sweet Matricia"
 Larissa Lai, "Rachel"
 Eden Robinson, "Terminal Avenue"
 Nnedi Okorafor, "When Scarabs Multiply"
 Vandana Singh, "Delhi"
 Tamai Kobayashi, "Panopte’s Eye"
 Sheree Thomas, "The Grassdreaming Tree" 
 Wayde Compton, "The Blue Road: A Fairy Tale"
 Karin Lowachee, "The Forgotten Ones"
 Greg van Eekhout, "Native Aliens"
 Celu Amberstone, "Refugees"
 Devorah Major, "Trade Winds"
 Carole McDonnell, "Lingua Franca"
 Ven Begamudré, "Out of Sync"
 Opal Palmer Adisa, "The Living Roots"
 Maya Khankhoje, "Journey Into the Vortex"
 Tobias S. Buckell, "Necahual"

Reviews
 by Gerald Vizenor
 The Hathor Legacy
James Schellenberg, "Science Fiction and Fantasy Reviews", Challenging Destiny, 5 August 2004.

Matthew Cheney, "So Long Been Dreaming: Postcolonial Science Fiction & Fantasy" (featured review), SF Site, 2004.

References

External links
 Contents List on Locus Magazine

2004 anthologies
African diaspora literature
Arsenal Pulp Press books
Canadian anthologies
Chinese-Canadian culture
Fantasy anthologies
Horror anthologies
Indian science fiction
Science fiction anthologies
Works by Nalo Hopkinson